United 2026, also known as the North American 2026 bid, was a successful joint bid led by the United States Soccer Federation, together with the Canadian Soccer Association and the Mexican Football Federation, to host the 2026 FIFA World Cup in the United States, Canada, and Mexico.

While the soccer federations of Canada, Mexico, and the United States had individually announced plans to field a bid for the 2026 World Cup, the concept of a joint bid among the three North American countries was first proposed in 2016. The joint bid was officially unveiled on April 10, 2017, under which the tournament would be held at venues in all three countries. A shortlist of 23 candidate cities were named in the official bid, with 17 in the U.S., 3 in Canada, and 3 in Mexico. Ten U.S. candidate cities will join three Canadian candidate cities, and three Mexican candidate cities, to form the roster of 16 cities that will host the matches of this World Cup. Although a joint bid, the majority of the matches will be held in the United States. Canada and Mexico will host 10 matches each, while the United States will host the other 60, including all matches from the quarterfinals onward.

On June 13, 2018, at the 68th FIFA Congress in Moscow, Russia, the United bid was selected by 134 votes to Morocco's 65. Upon this selection, Canada will become the fifth country to host both the men's and women's World Cup, joining Sweden, the United States, Germany, and France. Mexico will become the first country to host three men's World Cups, and the United States will become the first country to host both the men's and women's World Cup twice each. This will be the first World Cup to be hosted in three countries, as well as the first since 2002 and the second overall to be held in multiple countries.

Background
The three soccer federations of Canada, Mexico, and the U.S. announced interest to submit a bid for the 2026 World Cup years before the federations intended to unify their efforts.

In July 2012, Canadian Soccer Association president Victor Montagliani confirmed plans for a Canadian bid, saying: "We have verbally told FIFA that when the bid process begins for the next available World Cup, which would be the 2026 World Cup, that the CSA will be one of the countries putting in a formal proposal". At the time the bid was announced, Canada had hosted the men's 1987 Under-16 World Championship and the U-20 World Cups for both men and women; the country has since hosted the 2014 FIFA U-20 Women's World Cup and the FIFA Women's World Cup in 2015. In October 2013, Montagliani confirmed Canada's intention to bid for the 2026 tournament and the Canadian Soccer Association reiterated this in January 2014.

In September 2012, Mexican Football Federation (FMF) President Justino Compeán confirmed plans for a Mexican bid. In October 2013, Liga MX President said that Mexico was interested in joining forces with the U.S. to co-host a bid for the 2026 World Cup. On December 9, 2014, FMF confirmed that it was bidding for the 2026 World Cup.

On May 13, 2016, at the FIFA Congress in Mexico City, USSF board member John Motta told ESPN "whatever happens, we will bid for the 2026 World Cup -- either jointly (with Mexico or Canada) or we will go it alone." The United States hosted the 1994 FIFA World Cup and unsuccessfully bid for the 2022 World Cup, which was won by Qatar in 2010. On April 18, 2015, Brazilian legend Pelé stated that the United States should host the 2026 World Cup.

In December 2016 Victor Montagliani, CONCACAF president announced for the first time a possibility of a joint bid between the United States, Canada, and Mexico to host the 2026 World Cup.

On April 10, 2017, the three bodies officially announced their intent to submit a joint bid for the 2026 World Cup.

Bid process

Bidding for the 2026 FIFA World Cup was postponed due to the 2015 FIFA corruption case and the subsequent resignation of Sepp Blatter, then was restarted following the FIFA Council meeting on May 10, 2016, wherein the bidding process would consist of four phases:
May 2016 – May 2017: a new strategy and consultation phase
June 2017 – Dec 2017: enhanced phases for bid preparation
March 2018 – June 2018: bid evaluation
June 2018: final decision

With no rival bid having emerged since April 2017 the CONCACAF member federations of Canada, Mexico, and the United States sent a joint request to FIFA to hasten the bid process. Canada, Mexico, and the United States wanted FIFA to award the bid outside the traditional bidding process at the June 2018 FIFA Congress in Moscow if the CONCACAF-bid meets FIFA requirements.

However the FIFA Council decided on May 8, 2017, that FIFA would have a full bidding procedure. In order to ensure continental rotation of hosting duties, only the member associations of CAF, CONCACAF, CONMEBOL, and the OFC were invited, as these continental confederations had not hosted the two previous World Cups. A date of August 11, 2017, was set for submission of an intention to bid.

FIFA football tournament hosting experiences
Together, Canada, Mexico, and the United States have successfully hosted 13 FIFA events, which is the most of any trio of geographically connected nations in the world.
 
 1987 U-16 World Championship
 2002 U-19 Women's World Championship
 2007 U-20 World Cup
 2014 U-20 Women's World Cup
 2015 Women's World Cup
 
 1970 World Cup
 1986 World Cup
 1999 Confederations Cup
 1983 World Youth Championship
 2011 U-17 World Cup
 
 1994 World Cup
 1999 Women's World Cup
 2003 Women's World Cup

In addition, all three countries have hosted at least one Olympic football tournament. Canada played host in Montreal 1976, Mexico in Mexico City 1968, and the United States hosted twice – in Los Angeles 1984 and Atlanta 1996. The Atlanta Games were the first to include a women's tournament.

Bid committee

On July 6, 2017, a United Bid Committee was officially formed by the national federations of Canada, Mexico, and the United States, to kick off the bidding process to bring the 2026 World Cup to North America.

Honorary chairman of the board
Robert Kraft: National Football League and Major League Soccer executive and owner

United bid committee board of directors
Steven Reed – co-chairman, president of the Canadian Soccer Association
Decio de María – co-chairman, president of the Mexican Football Federation
Carlos Cordeiro – co-chairman, president of the United States Soccer Federation
Victor Montagliani – president of CONCACAF
Sunil Gulati – FIFA Council member
Don Garber – commissioner of Major League Soccer
Dan Flynn – secretary general of U.S. Soccer
Donna Shalala – trustee professor of Political Science at the University of Miami
Guillermo Cantu – general secretary of the Mexican Football Federation
Peter Montopoli – general secretary of the Canadian Soccer Association
Carlos Bocanegra – technical director of Atlanta United FC
Julie Foudy – founder of Julie Foudy Sports Leadership Academy and television analyst and reporter for ESPN/ABC
Ed Foster-Simeon – president and CEO of U.S. Soccer Foundation

United bid committee executive team
John Kristick – executive director for the united bid committee
Jim Brown – managing director, technical operations
Peter Montopoli – Canada bid director
Yon De Luisa – Mexico bid director

Potential venues

On August 15, 2017, the United Bid Committee released a list of 49 stadiums in 44 metropolitan markets across the three nations which will be considered for the official bid. The United Bid Committee planned to include 20–25 venues in the official bid, which was sent to FIFA in March 2018. Stadiums must have a capacity of at least 40,000 for group-round matches and at least 80,000 for the opening match and the final.

On September 7, 2017, the United Bid Committee announced that a total of 41 cities (with 44 venues) had submitted bids marking their official declaration of interest to be included in the final bid: Almost a month later, on October 4, 2017, the list of cities was cut down to 32 with 35 venues. During U.S. Soccer's annual general meeting in Orlando in February 2018, Gulati revealed that the list of cities had been cut down to 26 with 29 venues.

On March 14, 2018, Vancouver, Minneapolis and Chicago all announced that they were dropping out as potential host cities. All three cities cited concerns over the financial transparency of being a host city and cited FIFA's unwillingness to negotiate financial details as reasons for their decisions; the bid committee announced the next day they had reduced the number of cities in the bid to 23.

Cities had to submit written proposals to the United Bid Committee by January 19, 2018, before being selected by the committee.

The official bid has proposed the main opening match be held in either the Azteca Stadium in Mexico City or at the Rose Bowl in the Los Angeles area, that all three host countries' teams would host their first matches on the first day of the tournament and that the final match be held at MetLife Stadium in the New York City area. The bid also proposed that the two semi-final matches would be held at AT&T Stadium in the Dallas/Fort Worth area and Mercedes-Benz Stadium in Atlanta. All of the other cities in the American portion of the bid are under consideration for quarter-final matches. The bid book proposal calls for Mexico and Canada to each host seven group-stage games, two matches in the round of 32, and one in the round of 16.

 A  denotes stadium used for previous men's World Cup tournaments
 A  denotes an indoor stadium

Canada

Mexico

United States

* = Was not initially included in the bid book but is also being considered.

Additional venue information

Canada

Mexico

United States

Venues excluded since start of bidding process

Venues that withdrew voluntarily

Venues excluded from final list in June 2022

Venues that submitted bids but were rejected (2nd round)
The following cities were not selected as host cities bid, according to Sunil Gulati, during the 2018 US Soccer Annual General Meeting.

Venues that submitted bids but were rejected (1st round)

Venues that were contacted but submitted no bids

General facilities

Support

Football confederations 
Oceania Football Confederation
CONCACAF
CONMEBOL

FIFA members 

 Afghanistan
 Argentina
 Bolivia
 Brazil
 Chile
 Colombia
 Costa Rica
 Denmark
 Ecuador
 El Salvador
 Finland
 Germany
 Grenada
 Guyana
 Honduras
 Iraq
 Jamaica
 Liberia
 Namibia
 Nicaragua
 Panama
 Paraguay
 Peru
 Saudi Arabia
 Uruguay
 Venezuela
 Zimbabwe

Public opinion 
On October 24, 2017, a survey of adults in Canada, Mexico, and the United States showed a broad support for Canada–United States–Mexico bid to host the 2026 FIFA World Cup. It found that 77% of North American residents are in favor of hosting the first-ever 48-team FIFA World Cup, and 81% of respondents across the three countries agree that hosting the tournament would be good for their specific country. Also, nearly six in 10 (57 percent) of those surveyed say they would be interested in attending FIFA World Cup matches if the games were played near where they live or work.

U.S. House of Representatives 
On April 20, 2018, Representatives Darin LaHood and fellow co-chairs of the Congressional Soccer Caucus Kathy Castor (FL-14), Don Bacon (NE-02), Ruben Kihuen (NV-04) introduced a resolution to recognize and support the efforts of the United Bid Committee to host the 2026 FIFA World Cup in Canada, Mexico and the United States. The U.S. House of Representatives adopted this resolution on April 25, 2018.

Other government officials 
Toronto city councilors Mark Grimes and Cesar Palacio supported the bid, as well as Mayor John Tory. Montreal Mayor Valérie Plante also supported it.

On March 13, 2018, Canadian Minister of Sport Kirsty Duncan announced in Ottawa that the Canadian federal government officially threw its support behind the North American bid for the 2026 World Cup, with the promise of up to $5 million in immediate help should the unified bid win.

U.S. President Donald Trump, Canadian Prime Minister Justin Trudeau, and Mexican President Enrique Peña Nieto all supported the bid for the World Cup.

Marketing
The bid is branded "United 2026", the logo of the bid is a ball with the number 26 representing the year "2026" with the colors of the flags of Canada, Mexico, and the United States and the slogans are: "United As One". and "Football For All".

Opinions
On December 28, 2017, during a sports business conference in Dubai, United Arab Emirates, FIFA president Gianni Infantino considered the United bid to be a positive message.

Controversies
U.S. President Donald Trump's executive orders regarding immigration from certain Muslim-majority countries implemented in 2017 was touted as a potential risk, with Infantino saying, "Any team, including the supporters and officials of that team, who qualify for a World Cup need to have access to the country, otherwise there is no World Cup." In response, the Trump administration sent letters to FIFA that read, in part, that Trump was "confident" that "all eligible athletes, officials and fans from all countries around the world would be able to enter the United States without discrimination." In 2018, Trump then warned the countries that intended to support the Morocco bid to host the 2026 World Cup, tweeting: "The US has put together a STRONG bid w/ Canada & Mexico for the 2026 World Cup. It would be a shame if countries that we always support were to lobby against the U.S. bid. Why should we be supporting these countries when they don't support us (including at the United Nations)?" In January 2021, the travel ban was reversed by his successor Joe Biden.

References

External links
 

Canada-Mexico-United States
Bid 2026
Bid 2026
Bid 2026
Trilateral relations of Canada, Mexico, and the United States
Canadian Soccer Association
United States Soccer Federation